Kölln-Reisiek is a municipality in the district of Pinneberg, in Schleswig-Holstein, Germany.

References

Pinneberg (district)